Taake is the fourth studio album by Norwegian black metal band Taake. It was released on 20 October 2008.

Track listing 
All songs written by Hoest.

Personnel 
 Hoest Folkefiende – vocals, lead guitar, rhythm guitar, bass guitar, drums

References

External links 

 Taake at AllMusic

2008 albums
Taake albums